Maurice Wilbur "Moose" Peters (May 14, 1917 – April 6, 1987) was a jockey in Thoroughbred horse racing who accomplished the remarkable feat of winning a national riding title while still a seventeen-year-old apprentice. 

In 1938, Peters rode Dauber in all three of the U.S. Triple Crown races. They finished second to winner Lawrin in the Kentucky Derby, won the Preakness Stakes by seven lengths, and ran second to Pasteurized in the Belmont Stakes.

Maurice Peters was one of the founding members when the Jockeys Community Fund and Guild was formed in 1940.

In 1945, Peters began working as a trainer.

References

External links
 Photo of Maurice Peters aboard Fairy Hill finish in 1937 Santa Anita Derby (E.I. du Pont de Nemours & Company and du Pont family collections, William du Pont, Jr. papers at the Hagley Digital Archives)

1917 births
1987 deaths
American jockeys
American horse trainers
American racehorse owners and breeders 
American Champion jockeys
People from Eddy County, North Dakota
People from Charles Town, West Virginia